Spanish Train and Other Stories is the second album by Chris de Burgh, released by A&M Records in 1975.

Releases in some markets, like in North America, used different cover art from those in Europe. Rather than the simple white-on-black text of the European releases, the North American releases depicted an image of a distant train moving along under an evening sky.

Ban in South Africa
The title track is a story about a train carrying the souls of the dead to the Underworld. God and Lucifer are playing Poker – gambling with the souls. Lucifer cheats and wins the game. The song finishes with the stanza:

The song was deemed blasphemous in South Africa, and a ban was ordered. A&M records sued to get the ban overturned – the suit was eventually successful. However, while the suit was in progress, A&M released the album under the title "Lonely Sky and Other Stories" (without "Spanish Train"). This album is considered a collector's item today – copies are extremely rare. Perversely, the ban only applied to the LP record, so the cassette issue of Spanish Train was always freely available.

Track listing
All songs written by Chris de Burgh.
 "Spanish Train" – 5:00
 "Lonely Sky" – 3:52
 "This Song For You" – 4:14
 "Patricia the Stripper" – 3:30
 "A Spaceman Came Travelling" – 5:10
 "I'm Going Home" – 3:34
 "The Painter" – 4:20
 "Old Friend" – 3:40
 "The Tower" – 5:22
 "Just Another Poor Boy" – 4:46

Personnel
 Chris de Burgh – lead and all backing vocals, acoustic guitars, acoustic piano (3, 9)
 Ray Glynn – electric guitars
 Tony Reeves – bass guitar, string bass (5)
 Chris Laurence – string bass
 Tony Hymas – keyboards
 David Hentschel – ARP synthesizer (5), synthesizer arrangements (5)
 Ken Freeman – string synthesizer
 Phillip Goodhand-Tait – harmonium
 Chris Mercer – saxophone (7)
 Mick Eves – saxophone (7)
 Barry de Souza – drums
 Lennox Laington – percussion
 The Strings, Choir, Recorders and Ocarinas on "The Tower" and "Lonely Sky" were arranged by Robert Kirby who also arranged the brass for "Old Friend" and "This Song For You".
 Richard Hewson arranged the strings and brass for "Just Another Poor Boy" and "Spanish Train".

Production 
 Producer and Engineer – Robin Geoffrey Cable
 Assistant Engineers – Mark Dobson, Ian Major and John Kelly.
 Mixed at Scorpio and AIR Studios (London, UK).
 Mastered by Denis "BilBo" Blackham at Master Room (London, UK).
 Front and Back Illustrations – Bill Imhoff
 Inside Photography – Clive Arrowsmith
 Art Direction – Fabio Nicoli
 Design – Junie Osaki

Chart positions

References

External links
 The official Chris de Burgh site
 Album site on cd-lexikon.de (German)

Chris de Burgh albums
1975 albums
Albums arranged by Robert Kirby
A&M Records albums